Dehydrogenation of amine-boranes or dehydrocoupling of amine-boranes is a chemical process in main group and organometallic chemistry wherein dihydrogen is released by the coupling of two or more amine-borane adducts. This process is of due to the potential of using amine-boranes for hydrogen storage.

Catalysis
Many metal complexes catalyze the dehydrogenation of amine-borane (AB). Catalysis in the absence of metals has also been observed.

Pathways 
The dehydrogenation of AB would in principle afford (H2BNH2)n and (HBNH)n. The monomers (n = 1) are highly unstable with respect to oligomerization.

Metal carbonyl catalysts
Group 6 metal carbonyls upon photolytic activation catalyze dehydrogenation of AB. Secondary amine-boranes dehydrogenate to form cyclic dimers, or monomeric aminoboranes in the case of more bulky groups on the amine. Similarly, primary amine-boranes dehydrogenate through a two step intramolecular process to give aminoborane polymers, which further dehydrogenate to form borazines. [CpFe(CO)2]2 is also an effective precatalyst, requiring photolytic activation. The two step process is proposed to occur first by dehydrogenation of the amine-borane coordinated to the metal, followed by cyclodimerization in an off-metal step.

Rhodium and iridium catalysts
The first catalysts for the dehydrogenation of ABs were derived from reduction of Rh(I) complexes to form the active colloidal heterogeneous catalyst. As in the case with the metal carbonyl catalysts, bulky secondary amine-boranes form monomeric aminoboranes. For RhL2- and Rh(H)2L2-derived catalysts, the active species is a homogeneous catalyst, with the phosphine ligands interacting directly with the dehydrocoupling process. Changing the phosphine ligands from PiPr3 to PiBu3 significantly increases the turnover rate of the catalyst. Unlike other Rh(I) catalysts, the rhodium analogue of Wilkinson's catalyst RhCl(PHCy2)3 (Cy=cyclohexyl) behaves like the RhL2 and Rh(H)2L2 catalysts as a homogeneous species.

In comparison to RhCl(PHCy2)3, the iridium analogue has reduced catalytic activity on the dehydrogenation of non sterically hindered amine-boranes, and increased activity on more sterically hindered substrates. Dehydrocoupling of primary diborazanes NH2R—BH2—NHR—BH3 can be catalyzed by Brookhart's catalyst via conversion to the metal-bound species MeNH—BH2 and subsequent polymerization/oligomerization. This same reaction has been found to occur in the absence of the iridium metal, upon heating of the reaction mixture. Dehydrogenation of ammonia-borane with Brookhart's catalyst results in quantitative formation of the cyclic pentamer [NH2BH2]5 rather than the typically seen cyclic dimers from other amine-borane dehydrogenations. When catalyzing ammonia-borane dehydrogenation, the catalyst acts homogeneously at a 0.5 mol% catalyst loading. Rather than the typical high temperatures needed for this dehydrogenation, the reaction proceeds cleanly at room temperature, with complete substrate conversion in 14min.

Metallocenes
Group 4 metallocenes also catalyze dehydrogenation of ABs.  Activity is affected by metal (Ti > Zr > Hf) and inhibited by bulk. Unlike other catalytic processes, the reaction proceeds via a linear aminoborane [NR2BH2]2, which then cyclodimerizes through a dehydrocoupling process on the metal. Most of the zirconocene complexes contain the zirconium in the +4 oxidation state, and the systems are not very active catalysts for amine-borane dehydrogenation. In contrast to these systems, the cationic zirconocene complex [Cp2ZrOC6H4P(tBu)2]+ effectively catalyzes the reaction, with the most notable example being the dehydrogenation of dimethylamineborane in 10min at room temperature.

Potential applications

Hydrogen storage

Dehydrogenation of amine-boranes is thermodynamically favourable, making the process attractive for hydrogen storage systems. Ammonia borane has attracted particular interest due to its high weight percent of hydrogen (19.6%). Dehydrogenation occurs in three steps, creating polyamino-boranes and borazines as insoluble side products.  The dehydrogenation reactions are irreversible, which limits the utility of this process for hydrogen storage.

Hydrogen transfer
Amine-borane dehydrogenation can be coupled with hydride transfer to unsaturated functional groups, usually olefins in an anti-Markovnikov fashion. Hydroboration of the olefin and release of H2 from the amine-borane occur in parallel reactions, reducing the percent of olefin reduced.

References

External links

Organometallic chemistry
Chemical processes